Centriolar coiled-coil protein of 110 kDa also known as centrosomal protein of 110 kDa or CP110 is a protein that in humans is encoded by the CCP110 gene. It is a cell cycle-dependent CDK substrate and regulates centrosome duplication. CP110 suppresses a cilia assembly program.

References

External links

Further reading